Where Are the Joneses? is a 2007 British daily online filmed sitcom created by the Imagination Group and Baby Cow Productions, sponsored by Ford of Europe, and promotion by digital specialists Hot Cherry.

The script of each two- to five-minute episode is a collaboratively written by viewers via wikis and social networking sites such as mySpace, Facebook, Flickr and blogs, with each character having their own Twitter feed. The faux-documentary style video is filmed daily on location and is also available via YouTube. The first episode was released on 15 June 2007.

The plot follows Dawn Jones, who discovers in the opening episode that she is the child of a sperm donor and follows her travels around Europe to find her 26 siblings. It stars Emma Fryer in the lead role, with Neil Edmond as Ian, the first brother she locates and who travels with her.

Unusually, the production is released under a Creative Commons 'Attribution-Share alike' licence, allowing it to be freely re-edited, even commercially, and press coverage has considered it as 'Wikipedia-like' in allowing anyone to edit and contribute to the storyline. The internet-only release on the back of the current mania for online social networking has also generated substantial independent blog review and analysis.

References

External links
 
 Official wiki

Further reading
 The Imagination Group's Press Release (retrieved 16 July 2007)
 Media Guardian article (retrieved 16 July 2007)
 Sunday Times article 22 July 2007
 bowblog review (blog)
 NewTeeVee review (blog)

British comedy web series
Creative Commons-licensed podcasts